Ana Paola López Yrigoyen (born 9 February 1994) is a former Mexican professional football forward who last played for Cruz Azul (women) of the Liga MX Femenil.

International career
López was part of the Mexico women's national under-17 team who competed at the 2010 FIFA U-17 Women's World Cup in Trinidad and Tobago.

She was called into a training camp with the senior Mexico women's national football team in December 2019.

Personal life
López briefly attended the University of South Florida, before returning to Mexico to study political science at Instituto Tecnológico Autónomo de México.

References

External links
 
 

1994 births
Living people
Women's association football forwards
Mexican women's footballers
Footballers from Puebla
People from Puebla (city)
Liga MX Femenil players
Club Universidad Nacional (women) footballers
C.F. Pachuca (women) footballers
20th-century Mexican women
21st-century Mexican women
Mexican footballers